Institute of Water Modeling or IWM, is a government trustee of Bangladesh Water Resource Ministry and think tank that carries out research, planning and technology transfer related to water management projects in Bangladesh and is located in Dhaka, Bangladesh.

History
The Institute traces its origins to the Surface Water Simulation Modelling Programme which was founded 1986. It functioned under the Water Resources Planning Organisation. On 24 December 1996 the cabinet of Bangladesh Government decided to institutionalized the programme, which was renamed and established as Institute of Water Modeling on 1 August 2002.

References

Research institutes in Bangladesh
Government agencies of Bangladesh
2002 establishments in Bangladesh
Organisations based in Dhaka
Water supply and sanitation in Bangladesh
Research institutes established in 2002
Government agencies established in 2002